Howard Taylor (November 23, 1865 – November 26, 1920) was a tennis player from the United States.

Taylor performed well at the U.S. National Championships, reaching the Challenge Round in 1884 (beating Joseph Clark, Percy Knapp and William Thorne before losing to Richard Sears). Taylor reached the all comers final in 1886 (beating James Dwight and Clark before losing to Robert Livingston Beeckman). He reached the all comers final in 1887 (beating Oliver Campbell before losing to Henry Slocum). Slocum beat him in the all comers final again in 1888. Taylor also won the doubles title in 1889 alongside Slocum, finishing runner-up in 1886 and 1887.

Taylor attended Harvard University, where he was an NCAA singles and doubles champion in 1883. His occupation was a lawyer.

Grand Slam finals

Singles (1 runner-up)

Doubles (1 title, 2 runner-ups)

References

External links
Howard Taylor on the website of The New York Times

19th-century American people
19th-century male tennis players
American male tennis players
Harvard Crimson men's tennis players
Place of birth missing
United States National champions (tennis)
Grand Slam (tennis) champions in men's doubles
1865 births
1920 deaths
Tennis people from New York (state)